The men's 110 metres hurdles event at the 1970 Summer Universiade was held at the Stadio Comunale in Turin on 5 and 6 September 1970.

Medalists

Results

Heats
Wind:Heat 1: 0.0 m/s, Heat 2: -0.2 m/s, Heat 3: ? m/s

Final

Wind: 0.0 m/s

References

Athletics at the 1970 Summer Universiade
1970